Pandy Tudur is a village in Conwy county borough, in the north-west of Wales, and lies some 5 miles NE of Llanrwst.

Origins of the name 
The name was originally Pandybudr, from the Welsh pandy ('fulling mill') and budr ('dirty'). The meaning 'dirty fulling-mill' was considered unattractive and the adjective budr was replaced in Victorian times by the personal name Tudur, thus giving Pandytudur (supposedly 'Tudur's fulling mill').

Language 
According to the United Kingdom Census 2001, 55.5% of the population speak the Welsh language. The highest percentage of speakers is within the 5-9 age group, where 71.1% can speak the language. Children in the village mostly attend a small Welsh primary school in the nearby village of Llangernyw.

Facilities 
The village has a chapel of the Presbyterian Church of Wales.

Nearby lie the turbines of Moel Maelogan wind farm.

References

External links 

www.geograph.co.uk : photos of Pandy Tudur and surrounding area

Villages in Conwy County Borough